Entrerriense Futebol Clube is a Brazilian football team from Três Rios, Rio de Janeiro State.

History
They were founded on 12 December 1925.

The club has played at the top level of the Campeonato Carioca tournament. In the 1993 tournament they were relegated alongside their city rivals America, but the following season they won the 2nd level championship (Intermediate Division). Playing back at the Rio top level in 1995 they survived relegation on the field, but did not appear in the 1996 tournament.

Entrerriense returned to the Rio top level for 2002 following their success in both the 2001 2nd level tournament and the subsequent promotion qualifying event. However, they had a difficult season in the 2002 top level and were relegated.

After their last relegation, Entrerriense managed to play Campeonato Carioca Série A2 for two years before withdrawing from professional football in 2005.

Stadium
They play at the Odair Gama stadium which has a capacity of 10,000.

References

Association football clubs established in 1925
Football clubs in Rio de Janeiro (state)
1925 establishments in Brazil